This page is an overview of Cuba at the UCI Track Cycling World Championships.

List of medalists 

This a list of Cuban medals won at the UCI Track World Championships. This list does not (yet) include the amateur disciplines and defunct disciplines.

Sources

Most successful Cuban competitors

Medals by discipline
updated after the 2014 UCI Track Cycling World Championships

Cuba at the 2008 UCI Track Cycling World Championships

Cuba competed at the 2008 UCI Track Cycling World Championships in Manchester, Great Britain, from 26 March to 30 March 2008. The event consisted of 18 different disciplines for elite men and women, Cuba competed in 5 women's disciplines.

List of medalists 

Source

Results

Sprint

Time trial

Keirin

Scratch

Points race

Source

Cuba at the 2015 UCI Track Cycling World Championships 

Cuba competed at the 2015 UCI Track Cycling World Championships in Saint-Quentin-en-Yvelines at the Vélodrome de Saint-Quentin-en-Yvelines from 18 to 22 February 2015. A team of 6 cyclists (6 women, 0 men) was announced to represent the country in the event.

Results

Women

Sources

Cuba at the 2016 UCI Track Cycling World Championships

Cuba competed at the 2016 UCI Track Cycling World Championships at the Lee Valley VeloPark in London, United Kingdom from 2–4 March 2016. A team of 3 cyclists (3 women, 0 men) was announced to represent the country in the event.

Results

Women

Sources

References

See also
 Australia at the UCI Track Cycling World Championships
 Netherlands at the UCI Track Cycling World Championships

Nations at the UCI Track Cycling World Championships
Cuba at cycling events